John Wesley (2 March 1791) was an English cleric, theologian, and evangelist who was a leader of a revival movement within the Church of England known as Methodism. The societies he founded became the dominant form of the independent Methodist movement that continues to this day.

Educated at Charterhouse and Christ Church, Oxford, Wesley was elected a fellow of Lincoln College, Oxford, in 1726 and ordained as an Anglican priest two years later. At Oxford, he led the "Holy Club", a society formed for the purpose of the study and the pursuit of a devout Christian life; it had been founded by his brother Charles and counted George Whitefield among its members. After an unsuccessful ministry of two years, serving at Christ Church, in the Georgia colony of Savannah, he returned to London and joined a religious society led by Moravian Christians. On 24 May 1738, he experienced what has come to be called his evangelical conversion, when he felt his "heart strangely warmed". He subsequently left the Moravians and began his own ministry.

A key step in the development of Wesley's ministry was, like Whitefield, to travel and preach outdoors. In contrast to Whitefield's Calvinism, Wesley embraced Arminian doctrines. Moving across Great Britain and Ireland, he helped form and organise small Christian groups (societies) that developed intensive and personal accountability, discipleship, and religious instruction. He appointed itinerant, unordained evangelists—both women and men—to care for these groups of people. Under Wesley's direction, Methodists became leaders in many social issues of the day, including the abolition of slavery and prison reform.

Although he was not a systematic theologian, Wesley argued for the notion of Christian perfection and against Calvinism—and, in particular, against its doctrine of predestination. His evangelicalism, firmly grounded in sacramental theology, maintained that means of grace sometimes had a role in sanctification of the believer; however, he taught that it was by faith a believer was transformed into the likeness of Christ. He held that, in this life, Christians could achieve a state where the love of God "reigned supreme in their hearts", giving them not only outward but inward holiness. Wesley's teachings, collectively known as Wesleyan theology, continue to inform the doctrine of Methodist churches.

Throughout his life, Wesley remained within the established Church of England, insisting that the Methodist movement lay well within its tradition. In his early ministry years,  Wesley was barred from preaching in many parish churches and the Methodists were persecuted; he later became widely respected, and by the end of his life, was described as "the best-loved man in England".

Early life

He was the fifteenth child of Samuel Wesley and his wife Susanna Wesley (née Annesley). Samuel Wesley was a graduate of the University of Oxford and a poet who, from 1696, was rector of Epworth. He married Susanna, the twenty-fifth child of Samuel Annesley, a dissenting minister, in 1689. Ultimately, she bore nineteen children, of which nine lived beyond infancy. She and Samuel Wesley had become members of the Church of England as young adults.

As in many families at the time, Wesley's parents gave their children their early education. Each child, including the girls, was taught to read as soon as they could walk and talk. They were expected to become proficient in Latin and Greek and to have learned major portions of the New Testament by heart. Susanna Wesley examined each child before the midday meal and before evening prayers. The children were not allowed to eat between meals and were interviewed singly by their mother one evening each week for the purpose of intensive spiritual instruction. In 1714, at age 11, Wesley was sent to the Charterhouse School in London (under the mastership of John King from 1715), where he lived the studious, methodical and, for a while, religious life in which he had been trained at home.

Apart from his disciplined upbringing, a rectory fire which occurred on 9 February 1709, when Wesley was five years old, left an indelible impression. Some time after 11:00 pm, the rectory roof caught on fire. Sparks falling on the children's beds and cries of "fire" from the street roused the Wesleys who managed to shepherd all their children out of the house except for John who was left stranded on an upper floor. With stairs aflame and the roof about to collapse, Wesley was lifted out of a window by a parishioner standing on another man's shoulders. Wesley later used the phrase, "a brand plucked out of the fire", quoting , to describe the incident. This childhood deliverance subsequently became part of the Wesley legend, attesting to his special destiny and extraordinary work. Wesley was also influenced by the reported haunting of Epworth Rectory between 1716 and 1717. The Wesley family reported frequently hearing noises and occasionally seeing apparitions which they believed were caused by a ghost called 'Old Jeffery'.

Education

In June 1720, Wesley entered Christ Church, Oxford. After graduating in 1724, Wesley stayed on at Christ Church to study for his master's degree.

He was ordained a deacon on 25 September 1725—holy orders being a necessary step toward becoming a fellow and tutor at the university. On 17 March 1726, Wesley was unanimously elected a fellow of Lincoln College, Oxford. This carried with it the right to a room at the college and regular salary. While continuing his studies, he taught Greek and philosophy, lectured on the New Testament and moderated daily disputations at the university. However, a call to ministry intruded upon his academic career. In August 1727, after completing his master's degree, Wesley returned to Epworth. His father had requested his assistance in serving the neighbouring cure of Wroot. Ordained a priest on 22 September 1728, Wesley served as a parish curate for two years.

In the year of his ordination he read Thomas à Kempis and Jeremy Taylor, showed his interest in mysticism, and began to seek the religious truths which underlay the great revival of the 18th century. The reading of William Law's Christian Perfection and A Serious Call to a Devout and Holy Life gave him, he said, a more sublime view of the law of God; and he resolved to keep it, inwardly and outwardly, as sacredly as possible, believing that in obedience he would find salvation. He pursued a rigidly methodical and abstemious life, studied Scripture, and performed his religious duties diligently, depriving himself so that he would have alms to give. He began to seek after holiness of heart and life.

Wesley returned to Oxford in November 1729 at the request of the Rector of Lincoln College and to maintain his status as junior fellow.

Holy Club

During Wesley's absence, his younger brother Charles (1707–88) matriculated at Christ Church. Along with two fellow students, he formed a small club for the purpose of study and the pursuit of a devout Christian life. On Wesley's return, he became the leader of the group which increased somewhat in number and greatly in commitment. The group met daily from six until nine for prayer, psalms, and reading of the Greek New Testament. They prayed every waking hour for several minutes and each day for a special virtue. While the church's prescribed attendance was only three times a year, they took Communion every Sunday. They fasted on Wednesdays and Fridays until nones (3:00 pm) as was commonly observed in the ancient church. In 1730, the group began the practice of visiting prisoners in gaol. They preached, educated, and relieved gaoled debtors whenever possible, and cared for the sick.

Given the low ebb of spirituality in Oxford at that time, it was not surprising that Wesley's group provoked a negative reaction. They were considered to be religious "enthusiasts", which in the context of the time meant religious fanatics. University wits styled them the "Holy Club", a title of derision. Currents of opposition became a furore following the mental breakdown and death of a group member, William Morgan. In response to the charge that "rigorous fasting" had hastened his death, Wesley noted that Morgan had left off fasting a year and a half since. In the same letter, which was widely circulated, Wesley referred to the name "Methodist" with which "some of our neighbors are pleased to compliment us." That name was used by an anonymous author in a published pamphlet (1732) describing Wesley and his group, "The Oxford Methodists". This ministry, however, was not without controversy. The Holy Club ministered and maintained support for Thomas Blair who in 1732 was found guilty for sodomy. Blair was notorious among the townspeople and his fellow prisoners, and Wesley continued to support him.

For all of his outward piety, Wesley sought to cultivate his inner holiness or at least his sincerity as evidence of being a true Christian. A list of "General Questions" which he developed in 1730 evolved into an elaborate grid by 1734 in which he recorded his daily activities hour-by-hour, resolutions he had broken or kept, and ranked his hourly "temper of devotion" on a scale of 1 to 9. Wesley also regarded the contempt with which he and his group were held to be a mark of a true Christian. As he put it in a letter to his father, "Till he be thus contemned, no man is in a state of salvation."

Journey to Savannah, Georgia

On 14 October 1735, Wesley and his brother Charles sailed on The Simmonds from Gravesend in Kent for Savannah in the Province of Georgia in the American colonies at the request of James Oglethorpe, who had founded the colony in 1733 on behalf of the Trustees for the Establishment of the Colony of Georgia in America. Oglethorpe wanted Wesley to be the minister of the newly formed Savannah parish, a new town laid out in accordance with the famous Oglethorpe Plan.

It was on the voyage to the colonies that the Wesleys first came into contact with Moravian settlers. Wesley was influenced by their deep faith and spirituality rooted in pietism. At one point in the voyage a storm came up and broke the mast off the ship. While the English panicked, the Moravians calmly sang hymns and prayed. This experience led Wesley to believe that the Moravians possessed an inner strength which he lacked. The deeply personal religion that the Moravian pietists practiced heavily influenced Wesley and is reflected in his theology of Methodism.

Wesley arrived in the colony in February 1736, and lived for a year at the parsonage that stood on the site of today's Oliver Sturges House. He approached the Georgia mission as a High churchman, seeing it as an opportunity to revive "primitive Christianity" in a primitive environment. Although his primary goal was to evangelize the Native American people, a shortage of clergy in the colony largely limited his ministry to European settlers in Savannah. While his ministry has often been judged to have been a failure in comparison to his later success as a leader in the Evangelical Revival, Wesley gathered around him a group of devoted Christians, who met in a number of small group religious societies. At the same time, attendance at Communion increased over the course of nearly two years in which he served as Christ Church's parish priest.

Nonetheless, Wesley's High Church ministry was controversial among the colonists and it ended in disappointment after Wesley fell in love with a young woman named Sophia (or Sophy) Hopkey. He hesitated to marry her because he felt that his first priority in Georgia was to be a missionary to the Native Americans, and he was interested in the practice of clerical celibacy within early Christianity. Following her marriage to William Williamson, Wesley believed Sophia's former zeal for practicing the Christian faith declined. In strictly applying the rubrics of the Book of Common Prayer, Wesley denied her Communion after she failed to signify to him in advance her intention of taking it. As a result, legal proceedings against him ensued in which a clear resolution seemed unlikely. On 22 December 1737, Wesley fled the colony and returned to England.

It has been widely recognized that one of the most significant accomplishments of Wesley's Georgia mission was his publication of a Collection of Psalms and Hymns. The Collection was the first Anglican hymnal published in America, and the first of many hymn-books Wesley published. It included five hymns he translated from German.

Wesley’s “Aldersgate experience”

Wesley returned to England depressed and beaten. It was at this point that he turned to the Moravians. Both he and Charles received counsel from the young Moravian missionary Peter Boehler, who was temporarily in England awaiting permission to depart for Georgia himself. Wesley's noted "Aldersgate experience" of 24 May 1738, at a Moravian meeting in Aldersgate Street, London, in which he heard a reading of Martin Luther's preface to the Epistle to the Romans, revolutionised the character and method of his ministry. The previous week he had been highly impressed by the sermon of John Heylyn, whom he was assisting in the service at St Mary le Strand. Earlier that day, he had heard the choir at St Paul's Cathedral singing Psalm 130, where the Psalmist calls to God "Out of the depths."

But it was still a depressed Wesley who attended a service on the evening of 24 May. Wesley recounted his Aldersgate experience in his journal: 
"In the evening I went very unwillingly to a society in Aldersgate Street, where one was reading Luther's Preface to the Epistle to the Romans. About a quarter before nine, while he was describing the change which God works in the heart through faith in Christ, I felt my heart strangely warmed. I felt I did trust in Christ, Christ alone for salvation, and an assurance was given me that he had taken away my sins, even mine, and saved me from the law of sin and death."

A few weeks later, Wesley preached a sermon on the doctrine of personal salvation by faith, which was followed by another, on God's grace "free in all, and free for all." Considered a pivotal moment, Daniel L. Burnett writes: "The significance of Wesley's Aldersgate Experience is monumental ... Without it, the names of Wesley and Methodism would likely be nothing more than obscure footnotes in the pages of church history." Burnett describes this event as Wesley's "Evangelical Conversion". May 24 is commemorated in Methodist churches as Aldersgate Day.

After Aldersgate: Working with the Moravians

Wesley allied himself with the Moravian society in Fetter Lane. In August 1738 Wesley travelled to Germany, specifically to see Herrnhut in Saxony, as he wished to study at the Moravian headquarters there. On his return to England, Wesley drew up rules for the "bands" into which the Fetter Lane Society was divided and published a collection of hymns for them. He met frequently with this and other religious societies in London but did not preach often in 1738, because most of the parish churches were closed to him.

Wesley's Oxford friend, the evangelist George Whitefield, was also excluded from the churches of Bristol upon his return from America. Going to the neighbouring village of Kingswood, in February 1739, Whitefield preached in the open air to a company of miners. Later he preached in Whitefield's Tabernacle. Wesley hesitated to accept Whitefield's call to copy this bold step. Overcoming his scruples, he preached the first time at Whitefield's invitation a sermon in the open air, near Bristol, in April 1739. Wesley wrote,
I could scarce reconcile myself to this strange way of preaching in the fields, of which he [Whitefield] set me an example on Sunday; having been all my life till very lately so tenacious of every point relating to decency and order, that I should have thought the saving of souls almost a sin if it had not been done in a church.

Wesley was unhappy about the idea of field preaching as he believed Anglican liturgy had much to offer in its practice. Earlier in his life he would have thought that such a method of saving souls was "almost a sin." He recognised the open-air services were successful in reaching men and women who would not enter most churches. From then on he took the opportunities to preach wherever an assembly could be brought together, more than once using his father's tombstone at Epworth as a pulpit. Wesley continued for fifty years—entering churches when he was invited, and taking his stand in the fields, in halls, cottages, and chapels, when the churches would not receive him.

Late in 1739 Wesley broke with the Moravians in London. Wesley had helped them organise the Fetter Lane Society, and those converted by his preaching and that of his brother and Whitefield had become members of their bands. But he believed they fell into heresy by supporting quietism, so he decided to form his own followers into a separate society. "Thus," he wrote, "without any previous plan, began the Methodist Society in England." He soon formed similar societies in Bristol and Kingswood, and Wesley and his friends made converts wherever they went.

Persecutions and lay preaching
From 1739 onward, Wesley and the Methodists were persecuted by clergy and religious magistrates for various reasons. Though Wesley had been ordained an Anglican priest, many other Methodist leaders had not received ordination. And for his own part, Wesley flouted many regulations of the Church of England concerning parish boundaries and who had authority to preach. This was seen as a social threat that disregarded institutions. Clergy attacked them in sermons and in print, and at times mobs attacked them. Wesley and his followers continued to work among the neglected and needy. They were denounced as promulgators of strange doctrines, fomenters of religious disturbances; as blind fanatics, leading people astray, claiming miraculous gifts, attacking the clergy of the Church of England, and trying to re-establish Catholicism.

Wesley felt that the church failed to call sinners to repentance, that many of the clergy were corrupt, and that people were perishing in their sins. He believed he was commissioned by God to bring about revival in the church, and no opposition, persecution, or obstacles could prevail against the divine urgency and authority of this commission. The prejudices of his High-church training, his strict notions of the methods and proprieties of public worship, his views of the apostolic succession and the prerogatives of the priest, even his most cherished convictions, were not allowed to stand in the way.

Seeing that he and the few clergy co-operating with him could not do the work that needed to be done, Wesley was led, as early as 1739, to approve local preachers. He evaluated and approved men who were not ordained by the Anglican Church to preach and do pastoral work. This expansion of lay preachers was one of the keys of the growth of Methodism.

Chapels and organisations

As his societies needed houses to worship in, Wesley began to provide chapels, first in Bristol at the New Room, then in London (first The Foundery and then Wesley's Chapel) and elsewhere. The Foundery was an early chapel used by Wesley. The location of the Foundery is shown on an 18th-century map, where it rests between Tabernacle Street and Worship Street in the Moorfields area of London. When the Wesleys spotted the building atop Windmill Hill, north of Finsbury Fields, the structure which previously cast brass guns and mortars for the Royal Ordnance had been sitting vacant for 23 years; it had been abandoned because of an explosion on 10 May 1716.

The Bristol chapel (built in 1739) was at first in the hands of trustees. A large debt was contracted, and Wesley's friends urged him to keep it under his own control, so the deed was cancelled and he became sole trustee. Following this precedent, all Methodist chapels were committed in trust to him until by a "deed of declaration", all his interests in them were transferred to a body of preachers called the "Legal Hundred".

When disorder arose among some members of the societies, Wesley adopted giving tickets to members, with their names written by his own hand. These were renewed every three months. Those deemed unworthy did not receive new tickets and dropped out of the society without disturbance. The tickets were regarded as commendatory letters.

When the debt on a chapel became a burden, it was proposed that one in 12 members should collect offerings regularly from the 11 allotted to him. Out of this grew the Methodist class-meeting system in 1742. To keep the disorderly out of the societies, Wesley established a probationary system. He undertook to visit each society regularly in what became the quarterly visitation, or conference. As the number of societies increased, Wesley could not keep personal contact, so in 1743 he drew up a set of "General Rules" for the "United Societies". These were the nucleus of the Methodist Discipline, still the basis of modern Methodism.

Wesley laid the foundations of what now constitutes the organisation of the Methodist Church. Over time, a shifting pattern of societies, circuits, quarterly meetings, annual conferences, classes, bands, and select societies took shape. At the local level, there were numerous societies of different sizes which were grouped into circuits to which travelling preachers were appointed for two-year periods. Circuit officials met quarterly under a senior travelling preacher or "assistant." Conferences with Wesley, travelling preachers and others were convened annually for the purpose of co-ordinating doctrine and discipline for the entire connection. Classes of a dozen or so society members under a leader met weekly for spiritual fellowship and guidance. In early years, there were "bands" of the spiritually gifted who consciously pursued perfection. Those who were regarded to have achieved it were grouped in select societies or bands. In 1744, there were 77 such members. There also was a category of penitents which consisted of backsliders.

As the number of preachers and preaching-houses increased, doctrinal and administrative matters needed to be discussed; so John and Charles Wesley, along with four other clergy and four lay preachers, met for consultation in London in 1744. This was the first Methodist conference; subsequently, the Conference (with Wesley as its president) became the ruling body of the Methodist movement. Two years later, to help preachers work more systematically and societies receive services more regularly, Wesley appointed "helpers" to definitive circuits. Each circuit included at least 30 appointments a month. Believing that the preacher's efficiency was promoted by his being changed from one circuit to another every year or two, Wesley established the "itinerancy" and insisted that his preachers submit to its rules.

John Wesley had strong links with the North West of England, visiting Manchester on at least fifteen occasions between 1733 and 1790. In 1733 and 1738 he preached at St Ann's Church and Salford Chapel, meeting with his friend John Clayton. In 1781 Wesley opened the chapel on Oldham Street—part of the Manchester and Salford Wesleyan Methodist Mission, now the site of Manchester's Methodist Central Hall.

Following an illness in 1748 John Wesley was nursed by a classleader and housekeeper, Grace Murray, at an orphan house in Newcastle. Taken with Grace, he invited her to travel with him to Ireland in 1749 where he believed them to be betrothed though they were never married. It has been suggested that his brother Charles Wesley objected to the engagement, though this is disputed. Subsequently, Grace married John Bennett, a preacher.

Ordination of ministers

As the societies multiplied, they adopted the elements of an ecclesiastical system. The divide between Wesley and the Church of England widened. The question of division from the Church of England was urged by some of his preachers and societies, but most strenuously opposed by his brother Charles. Wesley refused to leave the Church of England, believing that Anglicanism was "with all her blemishes, [...] nearer the Scriptural plans than any other in Europe". In 1745 Wesley wrote that he would make any concession which his conscience permitted, to live in peace with the clergy. He could not give up the doctrine of an inward and present salvation by faith itself; he would not stop preaching, nor dissolve the societies, nor end preaching by lay members. In the same year, in correspondence with a friend, he wrote that he believed it wrong to administer sacraments without having been ordained by a bishop.

When, in 1746, Wesley read Lord King's account of the primitive church, he became convinced that apostolic succession could be transmitted through not only bishops, but also presbyters (priests). He wrote that he was "a scriptural episkopos as much as many men in England." Although he believed in apostolic succession, he also once called the idea of uninterrupted succession a "fable".

Edward Stillingfleet's Irenicon led him to decide that ordination (and holy orders) could be valid when performed by a presbyter rather than a bishop. Nevertheless, some believe that Wesley was secretly consecrated a bishop in 1763 by Erasmus of Arcadia, and that Wesley could not openly announce his episcopal consecration without incurring the penalty of the Præmunire Act.

In 1784, he believed he could no longer wait for the Bishop of London to ordain someone for the American Methodists, who were without the sacraments after the American War of Independence. The Church of England had been disestablished in the United States, where it had been the state church in most of the southern colonies. The Church of England had not yet appointed a United States bishop to what would become the Protestant Episcopal Church in America. Wesley ordained Thomas Coke as superintendent of Methodists in the United States by the laying on of hands, although Coke was already a priest in the Church of England. He also ordained Richard Whatcoat and Thomas Vasey as presbyters; Whatcoat and Vasey sailed to America with Coke. Wesley intended that Coke and Francis Asbury (whom Coke ordained as superintendent by direction of Wesley) should ordain others in the newly founded Methodist Episcopal Church in the United States. In 1787, Coke and Asbury persuaded the American Methodists to refer to them as bishops rather than superintendents, overruling Wesley's objections to the change.

His brother, Charles, was alarmed by the ordinations and Wesley's evolving view of the matter. He begged Wesley to stop before he had "quite broken down the bridge" and not embitter his [Charles'] last moments on earth, nor "leave an indelible blot on our memory." Wesley replied that he had not separated from the church, nor did he intend to, but he must and would save as many souls as he could while alive, "without being careful about what may possibly be when I die." Although Wesley rejoiced that the Methodists in America were free, he advised his English followers to remain in the established church.

Doctrines, theology and advocacy

The 20th-century Wesleyan scholar Albert Outler argued in his introduction to the 1964 collection John Wesley that Wesley developed his theology  by using a method that Outler termed the Wesleyan Quadrilateral. In this method, Wesley believed that the living core of Christianity was contained in Scripture (the Bible), and that it was the sole foundational source of theological development. The centrality of Scripture was so important for Wesley that he called himself "a man of one book," although he was well-read for his day. However, he believed that doctrine had to be in keeping with Christian orthodox tradition. So, tradition was considered the second aspect of the Quadrilateral. Wesley contended that a part of the theological method would involve experiential faith. In other words, truth would be vivified in personal experience of Christians (overall, not individually), if it were really truth. And every doctrine must be able to be defended rationally. He did not divorce faith from reason. Tradition, experience and reason, however, were subject always to Scripture, Wesley argued, because only there is the Word of God revealed "so far as it is necessary for our salvation."

The doctrines which Wesley emphasised in his sermons and writings are prevenient grace, present personal salvation by faith, the witness of the Spirit, and entire sanctification. Prevenient grace was the theological underpinning of his belief that all persons were capable of being saved by faith in Christ. Unlike the Calvinists of his day, Wesley did not believe in predestination, that is, that some persons had been elected by God for salvation and others for damnation. He understood that Christian orthodoxy insisted that salvation was only possible by the sovereign grace of God. He expressed his understanding of humanity's relationship to God as utter dependence upon God's grace. God was at work to enable all people to be capable of coming to faith by empowering humans to have actual existential freedom of response to God.

Wesley defined the witness of the Spirit as: "an inward impression on the soul of believers, whereby the Spirit of God directly testifies to their spirit that they are the children of God." He based this doctrine upon certain Biblical passages (see  as an example). This doctrine was closely related to his belief that salvation had to be "personal." In his view, a person must ultimately believe the Good News for himself or herself; no one could be in relation to God for another.

Entire sanctification he described in 1790 as the "grand depositum which God has lodged with the people called 'Methodists'." Wesley taught that entire sanctification was obtainable after justification by faith, between justification and death. Wesley defined it as:"That habitual disposition of soul which, in the sacred writings, is termed holiness; and which directly implies, the being cleansed from sin, ‘from all filthiness both of flesh and spirit;’ and, by consequence, the being endued with those virtues which were in Christ Jesus; the being so ‘renewed in the image of our mind,’ as to be ‘perfect as our Father in heaven is perfect."The term “sinless perfection” was one which Wesley avoided using "because of its ambiguity," rather, he contended that a Christian could be made "perfect in love". (Wesley studied Eastern Orthodoxy and embraced particularly the doctrine of Theosis). This love would mean, first of all, that a believer's motives, rather than being self-centred, would be guided by the deep desire to please God. One would be able to keep from committing what Wesley called, "sin rightly so-called." By this he meant a conscious or intentional breach of God's will or laws.

Secondly, to be made perfect in love meant, for Wesley, that a Christian could live with a primary guiding regard for others and their welfare. He based this on Christ's quote that the second great command is "to love your neighbour as you love yourself." In Wesley's view, this orientation would cause a person to avoid any number of sins against his neighbour. This love, plus the love for God that could be the central focus of a person's faith, would be what Wesley referred to as "a fulfilment of the law of Christ." He maintained that individuals could have assurance of perfection, akin to a second conversion or instantaneous sanctifying experience, through the testimony of the Spirit. Wesley collected and published such testimonies.

Advocacy of Arminianism

Wesley entered controversies as he tried to enlarge church practice. The most notable of his controversies was that on Calvinism. His father was of the Arminian school in the church. Wesley came to his own conclusions while in college and expressed himself strongly against the doctrines of Calvinistic election and reprobation. His system of thought has become known as Wesleyan Arminianism, the foundations of which were laid by Wesley and his fellow preacher John William Fletcher. Although Wesley knew very little about the beliefs of Jacob Arminius and arrived at his religious views independently of Arminius, Wesley acknowledged late in life, with the 1778 publication of The Arminian Magazine, that he and Arminius were in general agreement. Theology Professor W. Stephen Gunther concludes he was "a faithful representative" of Arminius' beliefs. Wesley was perhaps the clearest English proponent of Arminianism.

By contrast, Whitefield inclined to Calvinism; in his first tour in America, he embraced the views of the New England School of Calvinism. Whitefield opposed Wesley's advocacy of Arminianism, though the two maintained a strained friendship. When in 1739 Wesley preached a sermon on Freedom of Grace, attacking the Calvinistic understanding of predestination as blasphemous, as it represented "God as worse than the devil," Whitefield asked him not to repeat or publish the discourse, as he did not want a dispute. Wesley published his sermon anyway. Whitefield was one of many who responded. The two men separated their practice in 1741. Wesley wrote that those who held to unlimited atonement did not desire separation, but "those who held 'particular redemption' would not hear of any accommodation."

Whitefield, Howell Harris (leader of the Welsh Methodist revival), John Cennick, and others, became the founders of Calvinistic Methodism. Whitefield and Wesley, however, were soon back on friendly terms, and their friendship remained unbroken although they travelled different paths. When someone asked Whitefield if he thought he would see Wesley in heaven, Whitefield replied, "I fear not, for he will be so near the eternal throne and we at such a distance, we shall hardly get sight of him."

In 1770, the controversy broke out anew with violence and bitterness, as people's view of God related to their views of men and their possibilities. Augustus Toplady, Daniel Rowland, Sir Richard Hill and others were engaged on one side, while Wesley and Fletcher stood on the other. Toplady was editor of The Gospel Magazine, which had articles covering the controversy.

In 1778, Wesley began the publication of The Arminian Magazine, not, he said, to convince Calvinists, but to preserve Methodists. He wanted to teach the truth that "God willeth all men to be saved." A "lasting peace" could be secured in no other way.

Some have suggested that later in life Wesley may have embraced the doctrine of universal salvation, although this is disputed. The claim is supported by a letter Wesley wrote in 1787 in which he endorsed as "one of the most sensible tracts I have ever read" a work by Charles Bonnet in which the author's conclusion was, "There will therefore be a perpetual advance of all the individuals of humanity towards greater perfection or greater happiness."

Support for abolitionism

Later in his ministry, Wesley was a keen abolitionist, speaking out and writing against the slave trade. Wesley denounced slavery as "the sum of all villainies," and detailed its abuses. He addressed the slave trade in a polemical tract, titled Thoughts Upon Slavery, in 1774. He wrote, "Liberty is the right of every human creature, as soon as he breathes the vital air; and no human law can deprive him of that right which he derives from the law of nature". Wesley influenced George Whitefield to journey to the colonies, spurring the transatlantic debate on slavery. Wesley was a mentor to William Wilberforce, who was also influential in the abolition of slavery in the British Empire.

It is thanks to Wesley's abolitionist message that a young African American, Richard Allen, converted to Christianity in 1777 and later founded, in 1816, the African Methodist Episcopal Church (AME), in the Methodist tradition.

Support for women preachers
Women had an active role in Wesley's Methodism, and were encouraged to lead classes. In 1761, he informally allowed Sarah Crosby, one of his converts and a class leader, to preach. On an occasion where over 200 people attended a class she was meant to teach, Crosby felt as though she could not fulfill her duties as a class leader given the large crowd, and decided to preach instead. She wrote to Wesley to seek his advice and forgiveness. He let Crosby to continue her preaching so long as she refrained from as many of the mannerisms of preaching as she could. Between 1761 and 1771, Wesley wrote detailed instructions to Crosby and others, with specifics on what styles of preaching they could use. For instance, in 1769, Wesley allowed Crosby to give exhortations.

In the summer of 1771, Mary Bosanquet wrote to John Wesley to defend hers and Sarah Crosby's work preaching and leading classes at her orphanage, Cross Hall. Bosanquet's letter is considered to be the first full and true defense of women's preaching in Methodism. Her argument was that women should be able to preach when they experienced an 'extraordinary call,' or when given permission from God. Wesley accepted Bosanquet's argument, and formally began to allow women to preach in Methodism in 1771. Methodist women, including preachers, continued to observe the ancient practice of Christian head covering.

Personality and activities

Wesley travelled widely, generally on horseback, preaching two or three times each day. Stephen Tomkins writes that "[Wesley] rode 250,000 miles, gave away 30,000 pounds, ... and preached more than 40,000 sermons... " He formed societies, opened chapels, examined and commissioned preachers, administered aid charities, prescribed for the sick, helped to pioneer the use of electric shock for the treatment of illness, and superintended orphanages and schools (including Kingswood School).

Wesley practised a vegetarian diet and in later life abstained from wine for health reasons. He wrote, "thanks be to God, since the time I gave up flesh meals and wine I have been delivered from all physical ills." Wesley warned against the dangers of alcohol abuse in his famous sermon, The Use of Money, and in his letter to an alcoholic. In his sermon, On Public Diversions, Wesley says: "You see the wine when it sparkles in the cup, and are going to drink of it. I tell you there is poison in it! and, therefore, beg you to throw it away". These statements against alcohol use largely concerned "hard liquors and spirits" rather than the low-alcohol beer, which was often safer to drink than the contaminated water of that time. Methodist churches became pioneers in the teetotal temperance movement of the 19th and 20th centuries, and later it became de rigueur in British Methodism.

He attended music concerts, and was especially an admirer of Charles Avison. After attending a performance in Bristol Cathedral in 1758, Wesley recorded in his journal: "I went to the cathedral to hear Mr. Handel's Messiah. I doubt if that congregation was ever so serious at a sermon as they were during this performance. In many places, especially several of the choruses, it exceeded my expectation."

He is described as "rather under the medium height, well proportioned, strong, with a bright eye, a clear complexion, and a saintly, intellectual face". Though Wesley favoured celibacy rather than marital bond, he married very unhappily in 1751, at the age of 48, to a widow, Mary Vazeille, described as "a well-to-do widow and mother of four children." The couple had no children. John Singleton writes: "By 1758 she had left him—unable to cope, it is said, with the competition for his time and devotion presented by the ever-burgeoning Methodist movement. Molly, as she was known, was to return and leave him again on several occasions before their final separation." Wesley wryly reported in his journal, "I did not forsake her, I did not dismiss her, I will not recall her."

In 1770, at the death of George Whitefield, Wesley wrote a memorial sermon which praised Whitefield's admirable qualities and acknowledged the two men's differences: "There are many doctrines of a less essential nature ... In these we may think and let think; we may 'agree to disagree.' But, meantime, let us hold fast the essentials..." Wesley may have been the first to use "agree to disagree" in print—in the modern sense of tolerating differences—though he himself attributed the saying to Whitefield, and it had appeared in other senses previously.

Wesley was gravely ill during a visit to Lisburn in Ireland in June 1775. He stayed at the home of a leading Methodist, Henrietta Gayer, where it was thought he would die. Prayers were said "for another fifteen years" and he recovered.

Death

Wesley's health declined sharply towards the end of his life and he ceased preaching. On 28 June 1790, less than a year before his death, he wrote:

This day I enter into my eighty-eighth year. For above eighty-six years, I found none of the infirmities of old age: my eyes did not wax dim, neither was my natural strength abated. But last August, I found almost a sudden change. My eyes were so dim that no glasses would help me. My strength likewise now quite forsook me and probably will not return in this world.

Wesley was cared for during his last months by Elizabeth Ritchie and his physician John Whitehead. He died on 2 March 1791, at the age of 87. As he lay dying, his friends gathered around him, Wesley grasped their hands and said repeatedly, "Farewell, farewell." At the end, he said, "The best of all is, God is with us", lifted his arms and raised his feeble voice again, repeating the words, "The best of all is, God is with us." He was entombed at his chapel on City Road, London. Ritchie wrote an account of his death which was quoted from by Whitehead at  his funeral.

Because of his charitable nature he died poor, leaving as the result of his life's work 135,000 members and 541 itinerant preachers under the name "Methodist". It has been said that "when John Wesley was carried to his grave, he left behind him a good library of books, a well-worn clergyman's gown" and the Methodist Church.

Literary work

Wesley wrote, edited or abridged some 400 publications. As well as theology he wrote about music, marriage, medicine, abolitionism and politics. Wesley was a logical thinker and expressed himself clearly, concisely and forcefully in writing. Between 1746 and 1760, Wesley compiled several volumes of written sermons, published as Sermons on Several Occasions; the first four volumes comprise forty-four sermons which are doctrinal in content. His Forty-Four Sermons and the Explanatory Notes Upon the New Testament (1755) are Methodist doctrinal standards. Wesley was a fluent, powerful and effective preacher; he usually preached spontaneously and briefly, though occasionally at great length.

In his Christian Library (1750), he writes about mystics such as Macarius of Egypt, Ephrem the Syrian, Madame Guyon, François Fénelon, Ignatius of Loyola, John of Ávila, Francis de Sales, Blaise Pascal, and Antoinette Bourignon. The work reflects the influence of Christian mysticism in Wesley's ministry from the beginning to the end, although he ever rejected it after the failure in Georgia mission.

Wesley's prose, Works, were first collected by himself (32 vols., Bristol, 1771–74, frequently reprinted in editions varying greatly in the number of volumes). His chief prose works are a standard publication in seven octavo volumes of the Methodist Book Concern, New York. The Poetical Works of John and Charles, ed. G. Osborn, appeared in 13 vols., London, 1868–72.

In addition to his Sermons and Notes are his Journals (originally published in 20 parts, London, 1740–89; new ed. by N. Curnock containing notes from unpublished diaries, 6 vols., vols. i–ii, London and New York, 1909–11); The Doctrine of Original Sin (Bristol, 1757; in reply to John Taylor of Norwich); An Earnest Appeal to Men of Reason and Religion (originally published in three parts; 2nd ed., Bristol, 1743), an elaborate defence of Methodism, describing the evils of the times in society and the church; and a Plain Account of Christian Perfection (1766).

Wesley's Sunday Service was an adaptation of the Book of Common Prayer for use by American Methodists. In his Watchnight service, he made use of a pietist prayer now generally known as the Wesley Covenant Prayer, perhaps his most famous contribution to Christian liturgy. He was a noted hymn-writer, translator and compiler of a hymnal.

Wesley also wrote on physics and medicine, such as in The Desideratum, subtitled Electricity made Plain and Useful by a Lover of Mankind and of Common Sense (1759). and Primitive Physic, Or, An Easy and Natural Method of Curing Most Diseases.

In spite of the proliferation of his literary output, Wesley was challenged for plagiarism for borrowing heavily from an essay by Samuel Johnson, published in March 1775. Initially denying the charge, Wesley later apologised officially.

Commemoration and legacy
Wesley continues to be the primary theological influence on Methodists and Methodist-heritage groups the world over; the Methodist movement numbers 75 million adherents in more than 130 countries. Wesleyan teachings also serve as a basis for the Holiness movement, which includes denominations like Free Methodist Church, the Church of the Nazarene, the Salvation Army, and several smaller groups, and from which Pentecostalism and parts of the Charismatic movement are offshoots. Wesley's call to personal and social holiness continues to challenge Christians who attempt to discern what it means to participate in the Kingdom of God.

He is commemorated in the Calendar of Saints of the Evangelical Lutheran Church in America on 2 March with his brother Charles. The Wesley brothers are honoured with a Lesser Feast on 3 March in the Calendar of Saints of the Episcopal Church, and on 24 May (Aldersgate Day, with a Lesser Festival) in the Church of England's Calendar.

In 2002, Wesley was listed at number 50 on the BBC's list of the 100 Greatest Britons, drawn from a poll of the British public.

Wesley's house and chapel, which he built in 1778 on City Road in London, are still intact today and the chapel has a thriving congregation with regular services as well as the Museum of Methodism in the crypt.

Numerous schools, colleges, hospitals and other institutions are named after Wesley; additionally, many are named after Methodism. In 1831, Wesleyan University in Middletown, Connecticut, was the first institution of higher education in the United States to be named after Wesley. The now secular institution was founded as an all-male Methodist college.

A replica of the rectory where Wesley lived as a boy was built in the 1990s at Lake Junaluska, North Carolina. This was an addition to a group of buildings built starting in the 1950s for the World Methodist Council, including a museum which housed letters written by Wesley and a pulpit Wesley used. The museum was already having difficulty staying open, and the COVID-19 pandemic finally made closing the museum necessary. Its contents went to Bridwell Library of Perkins School of Theology, Southern Methodist University in Dallas, Texas.

In film
In 1954, the Radio and Film Commission of the British Methodist Church, in co-operation with J. Arthur Rank, produced the film John Wesley. This was a live-action re-telling of the story of the life of Wesley, with Leonard Sachs in the title role.

In 2009, a more ambitious feature film, Wesley, was released by Foundery Pictures, starring Burgess Jenkins as Wesley. The film was directed by the award-winning filmmaker John Jackman.

In musical theatre
In 1976 the musical Ride! Ride!, composed by Penelope Thwaites AM and written by Alan Thornhill, premiered at the Westminster Theatre in London's West End. The piece is based on the true story of eighteen-year-old Martha Thompson's incarceration in Bedlam, an incident in Wesley's life. The premier ran for 76 performances. Since then it has had more than 40 productions, both amateur and professional, including a 1999 concert version, issued on the Somm record label, with Keith Michell as Wesley.

See also
 John Wesley bibliography
 Sermons of John Wesley
 List of Methodist theologians
 History of Christianity in Britain
 Wesley College, for educational institutions named after Wesley

Notes and references

Citations

Sources

Books

Articles

Further reading

 
 
 
 
 
 
 
 
 
 
 
 
 
 
 
 
 
 

Historiography

External links

 
 John Wesley at the Eighteenth-Century Poetry Archive (ECPA)
 
 
 
 Selected text from the Journal of John Wesley on A Vision of Britain through Time, with links to the places named.
 John Wesley papers, 1735–1791 at Pitts Theology Library, Candler School of Theology
 John Wesley historical marker in Savannah, Georgia
 A Man Named Wesley Passed This Way historical marker at St. Simons Island, Georgia
 Reverends John & Charles Wesley historical marker
 The World Is My Parish historical marker

1703 births
1791 deaths
18th-century apocalypticists
18th-century English Anglican priests
18th-century English Christian theologians
Alumni of Christ Church, Oxford
Anglican saints
Arminian ministers
Arminian theologians
Arminian writers
British evangelicals
British expatriates in the United States
Burials at Wesley's Chapel
Christian humanists
Christian radicals
Christian revivalists
Christianity in London
Christianity in Oxford
Church of England hymnwriters
English evangelicals
English abolitionists
English Anglican missionaries
English Anglican theologians
English diarists
English letter writers
English Methodist hymnwriters
Hymnal editors
English pamphleteers
English sermon writers
Evangelical Anglican clergy
Evangelical Anglican theologians
Fellows of Lincoln College, Oxford
Founders of religions
German–English translators
Methodist theologians
People celebrated in the Lutheran liturgical calendar
People educated at Charterhouse School
People from Epworth, Lincolnshire
People of Georgia (British colony)
Presidents of the Methodist Conference
Protestant missionaries in England
Protestant missionaries in Scotland
Protestant missionaries in the United States
Translators of the Bible into English
John
Methodist abolitionists
Missionary linguists
18th-century diarists
18th-century Anglican theologians